Calyptomerus oblongulus is a species of minute beetle in the family Clambidae. It is found in North America.

References

Further reading

 
 

Scirtoidea
Articles created by Qbugbot
Beetles described in 1853